In algebra, the partial fraction decomposition or partial fraction expansion of a rational fraction (that is, a fraction such that the numerator and the denominator are both polynomials) is an operation that consists of expressing the fraction as a sum of a polynomial (possibly zero) and one or several fractions with a simpler denominator.

The importance of the partial fraction decomposition lies in the fact that it provides algorithms for various computations with rational functions, including the explicit computation of antiderivatives,  Taylor series expansions, inverse Z-transforms, and inverse Laplace transforms. The concept was discovered independently in 1702 by both Johann Bernoulli and Gottfried Leibniz.

where
 is a polynomial, and, for each ,
the denominator  is a power of an irreducible polynomial (that is not factorable into polynomials of positive degrees), and
the numerator  is a polynomial of a smaller degree than the degree of this irreducible polynomial.

When explicit computation is involved, a coarser decomposition is often preferred, which consists of replacing "irreducible polynomial" by "square-free polynomial" in the description of the outcome. This allows replacing polynomial factorization by the much easier-to-compute square-free factorization. This is sufficient for most applications, and avoids introducing irrational coefficients when the coefficients of the input polynomials are integers or rational numbers.

Basic principles 

Let 
 
The existence of the partial fraction can be proved by applying inductively the following reduction steps.

Polynomial part
There exist two polynomials  and  such that 

and

where  denotes the degree of the polynomial .

This allows supposing in the next steps that

Factors of the denominator
If  and 

and

This can be proved as follows. Bézout's identity asserts the existence of polynomials  and  such that 

It remains to show that  By reducing the last sum of fractions to a common denominator, one gets

and thus

Powers in the denominator
Using the preceding decomposition inductively one gets fractions of the form  with  where  is an irreducible polynomial. If , one can decompose further, by using that an irreducible polynomial is a square-free polynomial, that is,  is a greatest common divisor of the polynomial and its derivative.

with 

Statement

The uniqueness can be proved as follows. Let . All together,  and the  have  coefficients. The existence proof means that this map is surjective. As the two vector spaces have the same dimension, the map is also injective, which means uniqueness of the decomposition. By the way, this proof induces an algorithm for computing the decomposition through linear algebra.

If  is field of complex numbers, the fundamental theorem of algebra implies that all   have degree one, and all numerators  are constants. When  is the field of real numbers, some of the  may be quadratic, so, in the partial fraction decomposition, quotients of linear polynomials by powers of quadratic polynomials may also occur.

In the preceding theorem, one may replace "distinct irreducible polynomials" by "pairwise coprime polynomials that are coprime with their derivative". When  is the field of rational numbers, as it is typically the case in computer algebra, this allows to replace factorization by greatest common divisor computation for computing a partial fraction decomposition.

Application to symbolic integration

For the purpose of symbolic integration, the preceding result may be refined into

This reduces the computation of the antiderivative of a rational function to the integration of the last sum, which is called the logarithmic part, because its antiderivative is a linear combination of logarithms. 

There are various methods to compute decomposition in the Theorem. One simple way is called Hermite's method. First, b is immediately computed by Euclidean division of f by g, reducing to the case where deg(f) < deg(g). Next, one knows deg(cij) < deg(pi), so one may write each cij as a polynomial with unknown coefficients. Reducing the sum of fractions in the Theorem to a common denominator, and equating the coefficients of each power of x in the two numerators, one gets a system of linear equations which can be solved to obtain the desired (unique) values for the unknown coefficients.

Procedure 

and solving for the ci constants, by substitution, by equating the coefficients of terms involving the powers of x, or otherwise.  (This is a variant of the method of undetermined coefficients. After both sides of the equation are multiplied by Q(x), one side of the equation is a specific polynomial, and the other side is a polynomial with undetermined coefficients. The equality is possible only when the coefficients of like powers of x are equal. This yields n equations in n unknowns, the ck.)

A more direct computation, which is strongly related to Lagrange interpolation, consists of writing

where  is the derivative of the polynomial .

This approach does not account for several other cases, but can be modified accordingly:

Dividing by Q(x) this gives  and then seek partial fractions for the remainder fraction (which by definition satisfies ).
For example, take the following decomposition over R: 
In the partial fraction decomposition, the  first powers of  will occur as denominators of the partial fractions (possibly with a zero numerator). For example, if  the partial fraction decomposition has the form

Illustration 

In an example application of this procedure,  can be decomposed in the form

Clearing denominators shows that . Expanding and equating the coefficients of powers of  gives

Hence,

Residue method 

Over the complex numbers, suppose f(x) is a rational proper fraction, and can be decomposed into

Let

then according to the uniqueness of Laurent series, aij is the coefficient of the term  in the Laurent expansion of gij(x) about the point xi, i.e., its residue

This is given directly by the formula

or in the special case when xi is a simple root,

when

Over the reals 

Partial fractions are used in real-variable integral calculus to find real-valued antiderivatives of rational functions. Partial fraction decomposition of real rational functions is also used to find their Inverse Laplace transforms. For applications of partial fraction decomposition over the reals, see

 Application to symbolic integration, above
 Partial fractions in Laplace transforms

General result 

Let f(x) be any rational function over the real numbers.  In other words, suppose there exist real polynomials functions p(x) and q(x) ≠ 0, such that

By dividing both the numerator and the denominator by the leading coefficient of q(x), we may assume without loss of generality that q(x) is monic. By the fundamental theorem of algebra, we can write

where a1,..., am, b1,..., bn, c1,..., cn are real numbers with bi2 − 4ci < 0, and j1,..., jm, k1,..., kn are positive integers.  The terms (x − ai) are the linear factors of q(x) which correspond to real roots of q(x), and the terms (xi2 + bix + ci) are the irreducible quadratic factors of q(x) which correspond to pairs of complex conjugate roots of q(x).

Then the partial fraction decomposition of f(x) is the following:

Here, P(x) is a (possibly zero) polynomial, and the Air, Bir, and Cir are real constants.  There are a number of ways the constants can be found.

The most straightforward method is to multiply through by the common denominator q(x).  We then obtain an equation of polynomials whose left-hand side is simply p(x) and whose right-hand side has coefficients which are linear expressions of the constants Air, Bir, and Cir.  Since two polynomials are equal if and only if their corresponding coefficients are equal, we can equate the coefficients of like terms.  In this way, a system of linear equations is obtained which always has a unique solution.  This solution can be found using any of the standard methods of linear algebra. It can also be found with limits (see Example 5).

Examples

Example 1 

Here, the denominator splits into two distinct linear factors:

so we have the partial fraction decomposition

Multiplying through by the denominator on the left-hand side gives us the polynomial identity

Substituting x  = −3 into this equation gives A = −1/4, and substituting x  = 1 gives B = 1/4, so that

Example 2 

After long division, we have

The factor x2 − 4x + 8 is irreducible over the reals, as its discriminant  is negative. Thus the partial fraction decomposition over the reals has the shape

Multiplying through by x3 − 4x2 + 8x, we have the polynomial identity

Taking x = 0, we see that 16 = 8A, so A = 2.  Comparing the x2 coefficients, we see that 4 = A + B = 2 + B, so B = 2.  Comparing linear coefficients, we see that −8 = −4A + C = −8 + C, so C = 0.  Altogether,

The fraction can be completely decomposed using complex numbers. According to the fundamental theorem of algebra every complex polynomial of degree n has n (complex) roots (some of which can be repeated). The second fraction can be decomposed to:

Multiplying through by the denominator gives:

Thus we have a complete decomposition:

Example 3 

This example illustrates almost all the "tricks" we might need to use, short of consulting a computer algebra system.

After long division and factoring the denominator, we have

The partial fraction decomposition takes the form

Multiplying through by the denominator on the left-hand side we have the polynomial identity

Now we use different values of x to compute the coefficients:

Solving this we have:

Using these values we can write:

We compare the coefficients of x6 and x5 on both side and we have:

Therefore:

which gives us B = 0. Thus the partial fraction decomposition is given by:

(To this end, recall that the derivative at x = a of (x − a)mp(x) vanishes if m > 1 and is just p(a) for m = 1.) For instance the first derivative at x = 1 gives

that is 8 = 4B + 8 so B = 0.

Example 4 (residue method)

Thus, f(z) can be decomposed into rational functions whose denominators are z+1, z−1, z+i, z−i. Since each term is of power one, −1, 1, −i and i are simple poles.

Hence, the residues associated with each pole, given by

are 

respectively, and

Example 5 (limit method)

Limits can be used to find a partial fraction decomposition. Consider the following example:

First, factor the denominator which determines the decomposition:

On the other hand,

and thus:

and

This implies  and so .

For , we get   and thus  .

Putting everything together, we get the decomposition

Example 6 (integral)
Suppose we have the indefinite integral:

Before performing decomposition, it is obvious we must perform polynomial long division and factor the denominator. Doing this would result in:

Upon this, we may now perform partial fraction decomposition.

so:
.
Upon substituting our values, in this case, where x=1 to solve for B and x=-2 to solve for A, we will result in:

Plugging all of this back into our integral allows us to find the answer:

The role of the Taylor polynomial 

The partial fraction decomposition of a rational function can be related to Taylor's theorem as follows. Let

be real or complex polynomials 
assume that

satisfies

Also define

Then we have

Taylor's theorem (in the real or complex case) then provides a proof of the existence and uniqueness of the partial fraction decomposition, and a characterization of the coefficients.

Sketch of the proof

The above partial fraction decomposition implies, for each 1 ≤ i ≤ r, a polynomial expansion

which implies that the polynomial  is divisible by 

Since

we then have

Fractions of integers 

The idea of partial fractions can be generalized to other integral domains, say the ring of integers where prime numbers take the role of irreducible denominators. For example:

Notes

References

External links 
 
 
 Make partial fraction decompositions with Scilab.

Algebra
Elementary algebra
Partial fractions